The Thailand men's national floorball team is the national floorball team of  Thailand and is organized by Floorball Thailand which is under the care of the Thailand Hockey Association.

They are the winners of the inaugural Asia-Oceania Floorball Cup defeating Singapore in the final of the 2017 edition. Their biggest success on World Floorball Championship is 13th place in 2020.

Records

World Floorball Championships

Asia-Oceania Floorball Cup

Southeast Asian Floorball Championships

Southeast Asian Games

References

Thailand
Floorball
Men's national floorball team